This section of the list of rampage killers contains those mass murders where the perpetrators predominantly targeted their (former) co-workers.

A rampage killer has been defined as follows:

This list arbitrarily limits the scope of the subject to workplace rampage killings that meet the following criteria:

6 or more dead 
at least 4 people killed and least 10 victims overall (dead plus injured)
at least 2 people killed and least 12 victims overall (dead plus injured)

In all cases, the perpetrator(s) shall not be counted among those killed or injured.

All abbreviations used in the tables are explained below.


Rampage killers

Abbreviations and footnotes

W – A basic description of the weapons used in the murders
F – Firearms and other ranged weapons, especially rifles and handguns, but also bows and crossbows, grenade launchers, flamethrowers, or slingshots
M – Melee weapons, like knives, swords, spears, machetes, axes, clubs, rods, stones, or bare hands
O – Any other weapons, such as bombs, hand grenades, Molotov cocktails, poison and poisonous gas, as well as vehicle and arson attacks
A – indicates that an arson attack was the only other weapon used
V – indicates that a vehicle was the only other weapon used
E – indicates that explosives of any sort were the only other weapon used
P – indicates that an anaesthetising or deadly substance of any kind was the only other weapon used (includes poisonous gas)

References

workplace
Rampages
rampage